Ajaib  is a village of Rohtak district, Haryana, India. It is a part of Meham Choubisi.

See also
 Meham

References

Villages in Rohtak district